Yan Shimin (born 24 August 1987 in Zhejiang) is a Chinese rower.

References 
 

1987 births
Living people
Chinese female rowers
Rowers from Zhejiang
Asian Games medalists in rowing
Rowers at the 2006 Asian Games
Rowers at the 2010 Asian Games
World Rowing Championships medalists for China
Asian Games gold medalists for China
Medalists at the 2010 Asian Games